Anselmo Valencia Tori Amphitheater (commonly AVA Amphitheater) is the first amphitheater concert facility, in Tucson, Arizona, with a capacity of about 4,500-5,000. It officially opened on October 14, 2001, as part of the new Casino Del Sol, located on the Arizona Pascua Yaqui Tribe. It is named after Anselmo Valencia Tori, a World War II veteran and former chairman of the Pascua Yaqui Association.

Concerts

See also
List of contemporary amphitheatres

External links
Sol Casinos' AVA Amphitheater

Music venues in Arizona
Buildings and structures in Tucson, Arizona
Tourist attractions in Tucson, Arizona
Music venues completed in 2001